Wakashio is a ship name, which may refer to:

 
  (2007–2020; Japanese: わかしお), a Japanese capesize bulk carrier that ran aground and sank, causing an oil spill

Ship names